The McCullough–Price House is a 1938 pueblo revival home in Chandler, Arizona. The Chandler Museum is located in the house.

History
It was built as a winter residence for William D. McCullough of Detroit in 1938, but it was acquired by Arthur and Louise Price in 1950. (Louise Price was the niece of Dr. A. J. Chandler, who founded the city named after him.) In 2001, their daughter, Suzanne Price Propstra, donated the home to the city. By this time, it had been vacant and had become run down. Meanwhile, around the pueblo, major development was occurring, as Chandler Fashion Center was under construction (to open in October 2002). The city began to renovate the property into a state-recognized visitors center which opened in 2007 after $850,000 had been spent on improvements. But financial troubles and "fail[ure] to connect with an audience" (according to the city museum administrator Jody Crago) forced its closure in 2009. That same year, it was listed on the National Register of Historic Places.

It reopened in 2011 as an archive research center focusing on local history, office space for museum staffers (moving from the museum in downtown Chandler) and satellite exhibition space.

Notes

References

External links

 Museum homepage

Houses on the National Register of Historic Places in Arizona
Houses completed in 1938
Houses in Maricopa County, Arizona
Historic house museums in Arizona
Museums in Maricopa County, Arizona
Buildings and structures in Chandler, Arizona
National Register of Historic Places in Maricopa County, Arizona
Pueblo Revival architecture in Arizona